In superconductivity, a Pearl vortex is a vortex of supercurrent in a thin film of type-II superconductor, first described in 1964 by Judea Pearl. A Pearl vortex is similar to Abrikosov vortex except for its magnetic field profile which, due to the dominant air-metal interface, diverges sharply as 1/ at short distances from the center, and decays slowly, like 1/ at long distances. Abrikosov's vortices, in comparison, have very short range interaction and diverge as  near the center.

A transport current flowing through a superconducting film may cause these vortices to move with a constant velocity  proportional to, and perpendicular to the transport current. Because of their proximity to the surface, and their sharp field divergence at their centers, Pearl's vortices
can actually be seen by a scanning SQUID microscope.
The characteristic length governing the distribution of the magnetic field around the vortex center is given by the ratio /, also known as "Pearl length," where  is the film thickness and
 is London penetration depth.
Because this ratio can reach macroscopic dimensions (~1 mm) by making the film sufficiently thin, it can
be measured relatively easy and used to estimate the density of superconducting electrons.

At distances shorter than the Pearl's length, vortices behave like a Coulomb gas (1/ repulsive force).

References

Superconductivity